A Jésuite is a triangular, flaky pastry filled with frangipane cream and topped with sliced almonds and powdered sugar. The pastry originated in France and the name refers to the triangular shape of a Jesuit's hat.

See also

 List of pastries
 List of almond dishes

References

French pastries
Almond desserts